Sarah Hengler (c.1765 – 9 October 1845) was a British businesswomen and firework artist.

Biography
Hengler was born in Surrey in England. She was the second wife of the circus performer John Michael Hengler and they had three children together, including Henry Michael Hengler who was born in 1784 and was a circus rope walker. Sarah Hengler created and presented firework displays for Vauxhall Gardens, Astley's Royal Amphitheatre, the Royal Circus and the Surrey Theatre. John Michael Hengler died in 1802 and Sarah Hengler remarried in 1808. She continued to create firework displays running the business from a property, number 4 Asylum Buildings, off Westminster Bridge Road on the south side of Westminster Bridge in London. The property had a ground floor showroom, workshops for packing fireworks and accommodation for Hengler plus her staff and family members. Three people were killed in a series of explosions there in August 1818 and Hengler herself, who by then had retired and with the business being run by her family, was killed in a fire at the property during October 1845. In 1839 the poet Thomas Hood wrote Ode to Madame Hengler in her honour.

References

1765 births
1845 deaths
18th-century English businesspeople
18th-century English women artists
18th-century English businesswomen
19th-century English businesswomen
19th-century English businesspeople
19th-century English women artists
Deaths from fire
Fireworks
People from Surrey